Malcolm Bradley Frost (born July 28, 1966) is a retired United States Army major general who last served as Commanding General, Center for Initial Military Training, United States
Army, Training and Doctrine Command, Fort Eustis, VA. MG Frost most recently served as Chief of Public Affairs for the U.S. Army at the Pentagon in Washington, DC. Frost's previous assignment was Deputy Commanding General of the 82nd Airborne Division at Ft. Bragg, NC from March 2014 to March 2015.  In March 2014, Frost completed his assignment as Deputy Director for Operations at the National Military Command Center, J3 the Joint Staff at the Pentagon.  Prior to that, he completed an assignment as the Deputy Chief of Staff for Operations (G3/5/7) for the United States Army Pacific (USARPAC). and commanded the 2nd Stryker Brigade Combat Team, 25th Infantry Division.

Early life and education

Frost graduated from the U.S. Military Academy at West Point, New York, in May 1988.

Frost is a graduate of the Infantry Officer Basic and Advanced Courses, the Command and General Staff College, and the U.S. Army War College. He holds master's degrees in Human Resources Development from Webster University and Strategic Studies from the U.S. Army War College.

Career
In 1990, Frost was assigned with the 1st Battalion (Mechanized), 8th Infantry Regiment, 4th Infantry Division at Fort Carson, Colorado where he served as a Rifle and Support Platoon Leader and Company Executive Officer.

Italy and Bosnia

In 1993, Frost served with the 3rd Airborne Battalion Combat Team (ABCT), 325th Infantry in Vicenza, Italy where he served as the Battalion Logistics and Air Operations Officer and C Company Commander. His command tour included deployment to Bosnia-Hercegovina (former Yugoslavia) in support of Operation Joint Endeavor. On 18 December 1995, the company he commanded deployed from Aviano Air Base, Italy to Tuzla Air Base, Bosnia as the lead element from 3-325 ABCT, the first U.S. unit to deploy to Bosnia after the signing of the Dayton Peace Accords. C Company was responsible for security on the north side of Tuzla Air Base, including the Main Gate Entrance point. On 20 December 1995 his unit officially relieved elements of the United Nations Protection Force (UNPROFOR) as part of the Bosnia-wide transfer of authority from UNPROFOR to the NATO-led Implementation Force (IFOR).

The Old Guard and the Aide-de-Camp to the Army Chief of Staff
In 1996, Frost was assigned to Fort Myer, Virginia where he commanded C Company, 1st Battalion, 3rd U.S. Infantry Regiment, also known as "The Old Guard".

In 1998, Frost was assigned as the Aide-de-Camp to the Chief of Staff of the Army, General Dennis J. Reimer at the Pentagon.

82nd Airborne Division and the War in Afghanistan

In 2000, Frost was assigned to the 82nd Airborne Division at Fort Bragg, North Carolina where he served as the Division Training Officer and Operations Officer for both the 3rd Battalion, 504th Parachute Infantry Regiment (PIR) and 1st Brigade (504th PIR). His tour as Brigade Operations Officer was highlighted by 1st Brigade's deployment to Afghanistan in 2002-2003 in support of Operation Enduring Freedom. From December 2002 to May 2003, the brigade was the U.S. Army's sole combat brigade in Afghanistan. It  conducted over a dozen Brigade Air Assault operations, numerous Ground Assault Convoy operations, and several Air Drop and Civil Military operations. Under the theatre level Combined Joint Task Force 180 and the subordinate Combined Task Force 82, the brigade operated with numerous coalition and special operations partners against al-Qaeda and the Taliban.

Hawaii and the Iraq War
From 2004-2005, Frost served as the G3 and later Chief of Staff for the 25th ID (Light) Rear and U.S. Army Hawaii. 
In 2003, Frost was assigned to the 25th Infantry Division (Light) at Schofield Barracks, Hawaii where he served as the Chief of Exercises. Frost commanded the 2nd Battalion, 5th Infantry Regiment and later the 3rd Squadron, 4th US Cavalry Regiment, 25th ID from 2005-2008 to include 3-4 Cavalry's deployment to Iraq in 2006-2007 in support of Operation Iraqi Freedom. While deployed for 15 months during the Surge (Iraq War troop surge of 2007) in Iraq, 3-4 Cavalry was responsible for operations in Western Nineveh Province in the north of Iraq.

After the squadron returned from Iraq, Frost concluded his service in Hawaii with a six-month tour as the Chief of the Training and Exercise Division for the U.S. Army Pacific (USARPAC) at Fort Shafter, Hawaii.

After attending the U.S. Army War College, Frost returned to Hawaii and commanded the 2nd Stryker Brigade Combat Team, 25th ID at Schofield Barracks from 2009-2011.   It included the brigade's deployment to Iraq in 2010-2011 where it served in Diyala and Salah ad Din Provinces as an Advise and Assist Brigade (AAB)  in support of Operation Iraqi Freedom and later Operation New Dawn.

USARPAC
In September 2011, subsequent to his tour as a brigade commander, Frost served for nearly a year as the Deputy Chief of Staff for Operations (G3/5/7/9) for United States Army Pacific (USARPAC) at Fort Shafter, Hawaii.

National Military Command Center
Frost served as Deputy Director for Operations at the National Military Command Center, J3 the Joint Staff in the Pentagon in 2013-2014.

82nd Airborne Division
In March 2014, Frost became Deputy Commanding General (Support) for the 82nd Airborne Division, missioned as the Army's Global Response Force, at Ft. Bragg, NC.

Chief of Public Affairs, U.S. Army
In May 2015, Frost was assigned as the U.S. Army's Chief of Public Affairs, responsible for strategic communication, media relations, community relations, and public affairs proponency for the Army's military and civilian public affairs professionals.

CG, Center for Initial Military Training
In July 2017, Frost was assigned as the Commanding General for the U.S. Army Center for Initial Military Training (CIMT) at Fort Eustis, VA.   CIMT is responsible transforming civilian volunteers into Soldiers who are disciplined, fit, combat ready, grounded in Army values, and who increase readiness at their first unit of assignment. CIMT is also the Army's proponent for leading a generational shift in physical and non-physical fitness training through the development of the U.S. Army's Holistic Health and Fitness System.

Awards and decorations

References

1966 births
Place of birth unknown
Living people
United States Military Academy alumni
United States Army personnel of the Iraq War
United States Army Command and General Staff College alumni
Webster University alumni
United States Army War College alumni
Recipients of the Legion of Merit
United States Army generals